A gathering place is any place where people are able to congregate. Gathering places may be public; for example, city streets, town squares, and parks; or private; for example, churches, coffee shops, stadiums, and theaters.

Examples of gathering places include Stonehenge, the agora of ancient Greece, New York City's Central Park, and London's Trafalgar Square.

See also
Public space
Urban geography 
Community of place
Social environment
Oahu and its unconfirmed etymology

References

Community building